Edward Francis McLaughlin Jr. (August 18, 1920 – January 21, 2005) was an American attorney and politician who served as an assistant United States Attorney, Boston city councilor, president of the Boston City Council, and the 60th Lieutenant Governor of the Commonwealth of Massachusetts from 1961 to 1963.

As a member of the U.S. Attorney's office, McLaughlin was one of the prosecutors in the Brinks robbery case. He later served as a deputy general manager and chief legal counsel for the Massachusetts Bay Transportation Authority.

References

Bibliography
 Commonwealth of Massachusetts, 1961-1962 Public officers of the Commonwealth of Massachusetts, p. 23, (1961).
 Long, Tom.: EDWARD F. MCLAUGHLIN JR., 84, FORMER LIEUTENANT GOVERNOR, The Boston Globe (January 22, 2005).
 The Boston Globe, McLAUGHLIN, The Honorable Edward F. Jr. (January 24, 2005)
 The Boston Herald, Obituary; Edward McLaughlin funeral rites today, pg. 32 (January 25, 2005).
 Massachusetts Board of Bar Overseers McLaughlin's Bar Record (accessed January 21, 2009)
 McLaughlin, Peter.: My Grandfather: Edward F. McLaughlin Jr. The Life of a Lieutenant Overseas (accessed January 21, 2009).

1921 births
2005 deaths
Boston Latin School alumni
Dartmouth College alumni
Massachusetts Bay Transportation Authority people
Northeastern University alumni
Lieutenant Governors of Massachusetts
Massachusetts city council members
20th-century American politicians